Gustave Getz (August 3, 1889 – May 28, 1969) was an American professional baseball third baseman. He played in Major League Baseball (MLB) from 1909 through 1918 for the Boston Doves, Brooklyn Robins, Cincinnati Reds, Cleveland Indians, and Pittsburgh Pirates. He had one at-bat in the 1916 World Series for Brooklyn.

External links

Major League Baseball third basemen
Brooklyn Robins players
Boston Doves players
Cincinnati Reds players
Cleveland Indians players
Pittsburgh Pirates players
Minor league baseball managers
McKeesport Tubers players
Indianapolis Indians players
Elmira Colonels players
Newark Indians players
Newark Bears (IL) players
Toledo Mud Hens players
Reading Aces players
Scranton Miners players
Baseball players from Pennsylvania
People from Red Bank, New Jersey
1889 births
1969 deaths